Daniel Giménez Cacho (born May 15, 1961) is a Spanish-born Mexican actor and Ariel award winner, best known for portraying Tito the Coroner in Cronos (1993) and We Are What We Are (2010).

Career
He starred in several Mexican films and television series, such as Sólo Con Tu Pareja, Cronos, Midaq Alley, Tear This Heart Out and Bad Education. He has worked with several prominent Hispanic filmmakers, including Guillermo del Toro, Alfonso Cuarón, Jorge Fons and Pedro Almodóvar. He appeared in La hora marcada, the series written and directed by Alfonso Cuarón and Guillermo del Toro, and in the Mexican telenovela Teresa. His voice is heard throughout Y tu mamá también as the narrator. In 2009, he starred in the Mexican remake for the Argentinian series Locas de Amor. Cacho played the Armenian priest in The Promise, a film set in the Armenian genocide.

Filmography 

Bandidos (1991)
Solo con tu pareja (1991)
Cabeza de Vaca (1991)
Cronos (1993)
Midaq Alley (1995)
Nadie hablará de nosotras cuando hayamos muerto (1995)
Profundo Carmesí (1996)
Celos (Jealousy) (1999)
El Coronel no tiene quien le escriba (No One Writes to the Colonel) (1999)
Y Tu Mamá También (narrator) (2001)
Sin vergüenza (2001)
Asesino en serio (2002)
Aro Tolbukhin. En la mente del asesino (2002)
No somos nadie (2002)
Nicotina (2003)
La Mala Educación (Bad Education) (2004)
Perder es cuestión de método (2004)
Voces inocentes (2004)
Las vidas de Celia (2006)
La Zona (2007)
Arráncame la vida (2008)
El Infierno (2010)
We Are What We Are (Somos Lo Que Hay) (2010)
Get the Gringo (2012)
Colosio: El asesinato (2012)
Blancanieves (2012)
El Santos vs. La Tetona Mendoza (2012)
El Jeremías (2015)
A Monster with a Thousand Heads (2015)
Club de Cuervos (2015-)
You're Killing Me Susana (2016)
The Promise (2016)
The Summit (2017)
Zama (2017)
The Eternal Feminine (2017)
Chicuarotes (2019)
Devil Between the Legs (2019)
Memoria (2021)
Bardo (2022)

Awards and nominations 
Ariel Award in 1996 for Best Actor in Profundo Carmesí by Arturo Ripstein

References

External links 
 

Ariel Award winners
Best Actor Ariel Award winners
1961 births
Living people
Male actors from Madrid
Mexican male film actors
Mexican male television actors
Spanish emigrants to Mexico